Bolshoye Chebayevo is a rural locality (a village) in Pokrovskoye Rural Settlement, Velikoustyugsky District, Vologda Oblast, Russia. The population was 18 as of 2002.

Geography 
Bolshoye Chebayevo is located 34 km southeast of Veliky Ustyug (the district's administrative centre) by road. Maloye Chebayevo is the nearest rural locality.

References 

Rural localities in Velikoustyugsky District